The EMD G18 was an export locomotive introduced by GM-EMD in the late 1960s. The standard EMD suffixes applied after the G18 designation to indicate if the customer purchased locomotives with specific traction motors to fit narrow gauge (U) or broad gauge (W) rails. An (L) indicates a locomotive built with a lightweight frame, and (6) indicates A1A-A1A trucks. The similar EMD GA18 was a G18 designed as an extremely light locomotive with low axle loading and used freight car trucks driven by a cardan shaft and underframe mounted traction motors like its predecessor, the EMD GA8. A further variation was the G18B. They are powered by an EMD 8-645E prime mover rated at 1100 bhp and 1000 hp for traction and were produced with A1A-A1A or B-B trucks.

Several countries have purchased these locomotives.

A1A-A1A Version Original Owners

Chile

 1 FCAB 954

Indonesia

8  Indonesian Railways BB202 01-BB202 08 (Note: BB202 01 - BB202 03 are GL18U6)

B-B Version Original Owners

Chile

2  Andes Copper Mining  71-72

Iran

2  Rah E Ahan  40451-40452

Israel

1 Rotem Amfert Negev Ltd company in Mishore Rotem (former company name: Negev Phosphates Ltd)

Peru

1 Cerro de Pasco 24

Saudi Arabia

16  Saudi Govt. Railway 1006-1021

South Africa

19 Anglo American Corp. (1 unit no #); 1–3; 21–25;  Iron & Steel Corp.  36–42;  661.42-661.44

G18B  Original Owners

Algeria

5 SNTF 040DH1-040DH5 (Built by GMD)

References

G18
Diesel-electric locomotives of Algeria
Diesel-electric locomotives of Chile
Diesel-electric locomotives of Indonesia
Diesel-electric locomotives of Iran
Diesel-electric locomotives of Israel
Diesel-electric locomotives of Peru
Diesel-electric locomotives of Saudi Arabia
Diesel-electric locomotives of South Africa
Standard gauge railway locomotives
Metre gauge diesel locomotives
3 ft 6 in gauge locomotives
5 ft 6 in gauge locomotives